The short-headed roundleaf bat (Hipposideros breviceps) is a species of bat in the family Hipposideridae endemic to Indonesia. It is known only from the type specimen.

References

Hipposideros
Bats of Indonesia
Bat, Short-headed roundleaf
Mammals described in 1941
Taxonomy articles created by Polbot